Edgar Stanislavovich Olekhnovich (born 17 May 1987) is a Belarusian professional footballer who plays for Dinamo Brest.

Career
Olekhnovich made his debut for the senior national team of his country on 21 March 2013, after coming on as a substitute in a friendly match against Jordan.

Honours
BATE Borisov
Belarusian Premier League champion: 2010, 2011, 2012, 2013, 2014, 2015, 2016
Belarusian Cup winner: 2010, 2015
Belarusian Super Cup winner: 2010, 2011, 2013, 2014, 2015, 2016

International goal

External links

1987 births
Living people
Sportspeople from Brest, Belarus
Belarusian footballers
Association football midfielders
Belarus international footballers
FC Dynamo Brest players
FC BATE Borisov players
FC Shakhtyor Soligorsk players
FC Torpedo-BelAZ Zhodino players
FC Dinamo Minsk players